Marshall Bonwell Spence (born 21 February 1899) was an English professional footballer, who played for Huddersfield Town.

References

1899 births
Year of death missing
English footballers
People from Ferryhill
Footballers from County Durham
Association football defenders
English Football League players
Huddersfield Town A.F.C. players
FA Cup Final players